Steaua Dunării (Danube's Star) was a political newspaper and a unionist mouthpiece founded in October 1855 by Mihail Kogălniceanu. Editors like Vasile-Urechea Avexandrescu, Vasile Mălinescu, Iancu M. Codrescu and collaborators like Vasile Alecsandri, Costache Negruzzi, Alecu Donici, Grigore Alexandrescu, Alecu Russo, Dimitrie Bolintineanu, C.A. Rosetti, Gheorghe Sion wrote articles for the newspaper.

It was closed in September 1856 because of the suspension of the press laws. It was for the first time censored in May because of a religious article.

Kogălniceanu encouraged Nicolae Ionescu to issue the magazine L'Étoile de Danube in Brussels, as a French-language version of Steaua Dunării which was published between December 1856 and May 1858 and would also serve to popularize Partida Naţională'''s views.

It reappeared in November 1858 and closed again in November 1860. On January 2, 1859, it merged with Zimbrul și Vulturul and was renamed Steoa Dunărei. Zimbrulu şi Vulturulu.

Notes

Bibliography
 Academia Republicii Socialiste Române, Dicţionar Enciclopedic Român, volumul IV, 1966
 Predescu, Lucian, Enciclopedia României. Cugetarea, Editura Saeculum, București, 1999 
 Răduică, Georgeta, Dicţionarul presei româneşti (1731–1918)'', Editura Ştiinţifică, București, 

Political magazines published in Romania
Magazines established in 1855
Magazines disestablished in 1859
Mass media in Iași
1855 establishments in Europe
1855 establishments in the Ottoman Empire
19th-century establishments in Moldavia
Defunct magazines published in Romania